Bryce Deadmon (born March 26, 1997) is an American athlete who specializes in the 400 meters.

Career
A student at the Texas A&M University, Deadmon was the 2021 SEC Outdoor championship 400 m runner up running 44.50 behind Noah Williams, as well as the 2021 NCAA 400 m runner-up at Hayward Field at the University of Oregon in Eugene running 44.44 to finish behind Randolph Ross.

He qualified for the final of the US Olympic Trials men's 400 m race, running 45.46 and 45.17 in his heats to qualify as 8th fastest man. At the Olympics he took part in the Mixed 4 × 400 metres relay and the Men's 4 × 400 metres relay, winning a bronze medal in the former and a gold medal in the latter.

References

External links 
 
 
 
 
 

1997 births
Living people
Texas A&M Aggies men's track and field athletes
American male sprinters
African-American track and field athletes
People from Missouri City, Texas
Track and field athletes from Texas
Athletes (track and field) at the 2020 Summer Olympics
Medalists at the 2020 Summer Olympics
Olympic gold medalists for the United States in track and field
Olympic bronze medalists for the United States in track and field
21st-century African-American sportspeople
World Athletics Championships medalists
World Athletics Championships winners